The Siskiyou Mountains salamander (Plethodon stormi), also called the Siskiyou Mountain salamander, exists only in isolated locations along the Klamath River in northern California and southern Oregon. It is a close relative of the Del Norte salamander, and some herpetologists believe it may be a subspecies of that animal.

Description
The Siskiyou Mountains salamander is rich brown in color with white speckles. Like all of the plethodontids, it lacks lungs and respires through its moist skin. It is nocturnal, prefers cool, moist environments, and is most active during rainfall or high humidity. It stays underground during hot periods and freezes.

Conservation
Plethodon stormi is an IUCN Red List endangered species in California. Logging and damming have reduced its habitat.

Other local amphibians
In 2005, researchers discovered through genetic analysis that a larger, darker variant of this salamander is in fact a separate species. It has been named the Scott Bar salamander (Plethodon asupak).

Other prominent amphibians within the range of P. stormi include the rough-skinned newt, Taricha granulosa.

See also
 Siskiyou Mountains

References
 Sherman C. Bishop and Edmund D. Brodie, Jr. (1994) Handbook of Salamanders: The Salamanders of the United States, of Canada, and of Lower California, Cornell University Press, 555 pages  
 C. Michael Hogan (2008) Rough-skinned Newt (Taricha granulosa), Globaltwitcher, ed. Nicklas Stromberg

Line notes

External links
Photos of the Siskiyou Mountains salamander & its habitat

Plethodon
Salamander
Endangered fauna of California
Endangered fauna of the United States
Amphibians described in 1965